Oloff is a given name. Notable people with the name include:

Oloff Hennig, South African businessman 
Oloff Smith (1833–?), Swedish-born American Union Navy sailor
Oloff Johannes Truter (1829–1881), South African civil servant